Saginaw is an unincorporated community in Hot Spring County, Arkansas, United States.

The community is located on the Old Military Road (County Road 15) three-quarters of a mile east of Interstate 30, approximately one mile west of the Ouachita River and three miles southwest of Social Hill.

References

Unincorporated communities in Hot Spring County, Arkansas
Unincorporated communities in Arkansas
Arkansas placenames of Native American origin